The Serykh Gusey Islands (Острова Серых Гусей, Ostrova Serykh Gusey; "Grey Geese Islands") is an island group in the Chukchi Sea, located northwest of the shores of the Kolyuchin Bay. 
Administratively this island group belongs to the Chukotka Autonomous Okrug of the Russian Federation.

Geography
The islands are in the area of the Belyaka Spit, which encloses the Kolyuchin Bay, isolating it from the Chukchi Sea.

The area is marked by sandy flats, beaches and dry crowberry (Empetrum nigrum) tundra. Shingle beaches give way to flat, turfy surfaces. Yuzhnyy Island is dotted with small brackish pools.

The waters around these coastal islands are frozen for about nine or ten months on a yearly average, so that they are merged with the mainland most of the year.

See also 
 List of islands of Russia

References

External links 
 Steller’s Eider in the Serykh Gusey Islands

Islands of the Chukchi Sea
Islands of Chukotka Autonomous Okrug